A number of steamships were named Burutu, including

, a British cargo ship that was lost in 1918 due to a collision with another ship.
, a British cargo ship in service 1920–34

Ship names